Ümid FK was an Azerbaijani football club from Cəlilabad founded in 1990, and dissolved in 1993.

They participated in the Azerbaijan Top Division twice, 1992 and 1993, finishing 11th and then 20th. Sabir Mütəllimov and Xəzər Abbasov were the club's top goalscorers during this period with 7 goals, all of which came in the 1992 season.

League and domestic cup history

References 

Umid
Association football clubs established in 1990
Defunct football clubs in Azerbaijan